Andrei Aleksandrovich Volobuyev (born 22 September 1984) is a former Russian professional football player.

Club career
He played two seasons in the Russian Football National League for FC Mashuk-KMV Pyatigorsk.

External links
 
 

1984 births
Living people
Russian footballers
Association football forwards
FC Dynamo Stavropol players
FC Mashuk-KMV Pyatigorsk players